Quantez is a 1957 American CinemaScope Western film directed by Harry Keller and starring Fred MacMurray and Dorothy Malone.

Plot
Heller's (John Larch) gang of outlaws pull a robbery, kill a man and ride toward Mexico, fleeing a posse. To spend the night, they first head for the border town of Quantez, but are shocked to discover that it has become a ghost town, with no one else there.

Gentry (Fred MacMurray), the gang's most experienced man, finds liquor in the saloon, while Teach (John Gavin), a younger gunslinger, becomes interested in Chaney (Dorothy Malone), who is Heller's woman but upset over the murder during the holdup. Gato, who was raised by Apaches, is infuriated by Heller's referring to him as "breed" and making him proceed on foot after a horse collapses from exhaustion.

Gato (Sydney Chaplin) discovers a warning from Apaches to anyone who comes to town. He seeks out Delgadito (Michael Ansara), the tribe's leader, and proposes they kill the whites and divide the loot. Heller, meantime, is trying to get his partners to do the same, kill the others so there's more money to split among who's left. Gentry and Teach both have feelings for Chaney, who wants to leave town as soon as possible.

A wandering minstrel comes to town, calling himself Puritan (James Barton), and while he paints Heller's portrait, he sings a song about John Coventry, a legendary outlaw in these parts. Puritan is suddenly astonished when he spots Gentry and realizes that he is Coventry. The veteran gunman is trying to put his violent life behind him for good.

In a final gunfight, Gato is killed by Delgalito after a betrayal. Heller is killed by Gentry, and with arrows raining down, Gentry sacrifices himself, providing cover while Chaney and Teach make their getaway.

Cast
 Fred MacMurray as Gentry / John Coventry
 Dorothy Malone as Chaney
 James Barton as Puritan
 Sydney Chaplin as Gato 
 John Gavin as Teach
 John Larch as Heller
 Michael Ansara as Delgadito

Reaction
The New York Times said the film "could hardly be duller".

References

External links
 
 
 
 
 

1957 Western (genre) films
1957 films
American Western (genre) films
Films with screenplays by Robert Wright Campbell
Films directed by Harry Keller
Films scored by Herman Stein
Universal Pictures films
CinemaScope films
1950s English-language films
1950s American films